Majki may refer to the following places:
Majki, Ostrołęka County in Masovian Voivodeship (east-central Poland)
Majki, Sierpc County in Masovian Voivodeship (east-central Poland)
Majki, Warmian-Masurian Voivodeship (north Poland)